Pokeno is a game manufactured by United States Playing Card Company. First released in 1930, the game is a combination of poker and keno (or lotto) and is similar to the game of bingo in several aspects.

Gameplay
The game can be played by between 2 and 13 people. The dealer places five ranks of five squares across the board for a total of 25 squares. With another deck of cards at hand, cards are turned over one at a time and each player who has a board with that playing card pictured places a poker chip or other marking device over the square. The first player to get five squares in a row is the winner.

Methods of scoring
There are many possible ways to keep score in Pokeno.

 The winner receives a reward, greater or lesser, according to the poker value of the line or "hand." Note that the boards are arranged so that each vertical and horizontal line represents a different poker hand, ranging from "straight flush" to "one pair." No boards are better than others. All are intended to be balanced.
 The same as before except that the dealer continues turning over cards until every player has five in a row; the player with the highest poker hand covered is the winner.
 Pokeno may be played similarly to Blackjack, where the dealer covers his own board and plays against each individual player. The dealer turns over playing cards until he has five in a row covered on his own board. Any player who does not have five in a row covered, or whose row has a lesser value than the dealer's, loses. The dealer loses to those who have rows covered of greater poker value. Larger hands may bring a greater reward.
 Pokeno may be played similarly to keno. Each player except the dealer or "banker" is given a board and may bet on any figure that automatically covers one row and one column. The banker turns over playing cards and the players cover only those called that are in the two rows on which he wagers. If one of these two rows is not covered by any player so that no one is "out" by the time twenty-five cards are turned over, the banker gets the wagers. If player is "out" on either his horizontal or vertical row, that player gets a certain standard reward arranged in proportion, as in roulette.
 Pokeno may be played like regular bingo with poker cards instead of numbers/bingo balls.

References

American card games